Severely elevated blood pressure (equal to or greater than a systolic 180 or diastolic of 120—sometimes termed malignant or accelerated hypertension) is referred to as a hypertensive crisis, as blood pressure at this level confers a high risk of complications. People with blood pressures in this range may have no symptoms, but are more likely to report headaches (22% of cases) and dizziness than the general population. Other symptoms accompanying a hypertensive crisis may include visual deterioration due to retinopathy, breathlessness due to heart failure, or a general feeling of malaise due to kidney failure. Most people with a hypertensive crisis are known to have elevated blood pressure, but additional triggers may have led to a sudden rise.

A "hypertensive emergency" is diagnosed when there is evidence of direct damage to one or more organs as a result of severely elevated blood pressure greater than 180 systolic or 120 diastolic. This may include hypertensive encephalopathy, caused by brain swelling and dysfunction, and characterized by headaches and an altered level of consciousness (confusion or drowsiness). Retinal papilledema and/or fundal bleeds and exudates are another sign of target organ damage. Chest pain may indicate heart muscle damage (which may progress to myocardial infarction) or sometimes aortic dissection, the tearing of the inner wall of the aorta. Breathlessness, cough, and the coughing up of blood-stained sputum are characteristic signs of pulmonary edema, the swelling of lung tissue due to left ventricular failure an inability of the left ventricle of the heart to adequately pump blood from the lungs into the arterial system. Rapid deterioration of kidney function (acute kidney injury) and microangiopathic hemolytic anemia (destruction of blood cells) may also occur. In these situations, rapid reduction of the blood pressure is mandated to stop ongoing organ damage. In contrast there is no evidence that blood pressure needs to be lowered rapidly in hypertensive urgencies where there is no evidence of target organ damage and over aggressive reduction of blood pressure is not without risks. Use of oral medications to lower the BP gradually over 24 to 48h is advocated in hypertensive urgencies.

There are several etiologies of a hypertensive crisis, including a tumor. A rare, neuroendocrine tumor called a pheochromocytoma can cause a hypertensive crisis due to elevated levels of catecholamines.

References 

Hypertension